Leo Taisto Sakari Juuti (born 14 January 1931) is a Finnish diplomat and lawyer.

Juuti was born in Terijoki, and obtained a master's degree in law in 1956. 

He was an Ambassador in Havana between 1980 and 1983, and since 1983 he has been the  Chief of the Legal Department of the Ministry for Foreign Affairs. Previously, he had been  Finnish Chargé d'Affaires to  Addis Ababa from  1977 to 1979.

References 

Ambassadors of Finland to Cuba
20th-century Finnish lawyers
1931 births
People from Zelenogorsk, Saint Petersburg
Living people
Ambassadors of Finland to Ethiopia